The white-crowned forktail (Enicurus leschenaulti) is a species of forktail in the family Muscicapidae. Scientifically described in 1818, it has five subspecies, each occupying a different geographic range. It has a black throat and breast, black mantle, and largely black wings. The rump and lower back are white, and the bird has a prominent white crown, from which it gets its name. As with other forktails, the tail is long, deeply forked, and banded in black and white. A variety of whistling and clicking calls have been described. Slight morphological differences have been observed between subspecies.

A shy bird, the white-crowned forktail stays near water, and forages on the edges of rivers and streams for invertebrates. Its breeding season is between March and September, and possibly extends till October. Its nests are also built near the water, and are constructed of plant material. The eggs are between two and five in number, though there is latitudinal variation. Multiple broods in a year have been observed in China. The white-crowned forktail is found in China, Southeast Asia and also in northeastern parts of the  Indian subcontinent. Its natural habitats are subtropical or tropical moist lowland forests and subtropical or tropical moist montane forests. It is categorized as a species of least concern by the International Union for Conservation of Nature.

Taxonomy
The white-crowned forktail was scientifically described in 1818 by French ornithologist Louis Jean Pierre Vieillot. The specimen described came from Java. Five subspecies have been described. E. l. indicus is found from Sikkim to Myanmar, the Chinese province of Yunnan, northern Thailand, and Vietnam. E. l. sinensis is found in southern and eastern China, including in the regions of Qinghai, Gansu, Sichuan, Zhejiang, and Guangdong. E. l. frontalis is seen in the southern and central parts of the Malay Peninsula, on the islands of Nias and Sumatra. E. l. chaseni is found only on Batu island. E. l. leschenaulti is found in Java and on the island of Bali.
The species was found to be more distantly related to the slaty-backed forktail and the little forktail than to other forktail species. The precise geographic delineation between E. l. borneensis and E. l. frontalis is not known. It is closely related to the Bornean forktail (Enicurus borneensis) which replaces it in mountain areas of Borneo. E. borneensis was previously considered a sixth subspecies of the white-crowned forktail. It is genetically distinct from the white-crowned forktail, but morphologically similar.

Description

The white-crowned forktail is the largest of the forktails. It has black feathering on its throat extending down to its breast, as well as a black face and scapulars. The crown and forehead have a prominent white patch, sometimes visible as a slight crest, from which the bird gets its name. The belly of the bird is white, and is sharply delineated from the throat and face. The lower back and rump of the bird are white. The tail of the species is long and evenly graduated, with a deep fork. It has white tips, and the outer feathers are white. It also has three narrower white bands created by the tips of shorter tail feathers. The wings of this species are largely black with a prominent white band across the greater coverts. Juveniles of the species have brownish black upperparts, breast, and throat, brown flanks, and brown mottling on the belly. They also lack the prominent white crown. The bill of the species is black, while the feet are pinkish in color.

Its mantle is completely black, a feature used to distinguish the species from the spotted forktail, which has a speckled mantle, and from the slaty-backed forktail, which has a slate-grey mantle. It is distinguished from the black-backed forktail by its longer tail and larger size. The Indian subspecies E. l. indicus has a bill slightly longer than the nominate subspecies E. l. leschenaulti, while the bill of the Chinese subspecies E. l. sinensis is slightly shorter than that of the nominate. The subspecies frontalis is somewhat smaller than the others, and the extent of white on its crown is smaller:  E. l. borneensis is similar to frontalis but has a longer tail. E. l. chaseni is larger than birds from the rest of Sumatra, and also has a longer tail.

Multiple calls have been observed. The alarm call and contact calls are high-pitched, ringing lengthy whistles, described as "tseee, tseee" or "zweeet": these calls are repeated multiple times, with pauses in between. The alarm call is harsher and more emphatic, described as "scree" or "scree chit chit". Males use a long and complex whistled song when displaying or exhibiting territorial behavior; this often consists of a long whistle that fades away, followed by shorter whistles, clicking or chacking noises, or bell-like sounds. The call of the borneensis subspecies is slightly different from the others.

Distribution and habitat
The habitat of the white-crowned forktail is subtropical or tropical regions in moist lowland forests and moist broadleaf montane forests. As is the case with other forktail species, the white-crowned forktail frequents fast-flowing rivers, waterfalls, and streams within the forests, though it may move to slower moving water sources in the winter. Its elevational range has been observed to vary seasonally, and in the northeastern regions of the Indian subcontinent, it is likely to migrate seasonally; all records from Bangladesh are from winter months. It also frequents damp areas and pools within the forest, including animal wallows, swampy areas, and water ditches. It may be found along slower-moving rivers and streams in the lowland regions of its distribution. It prefers areas screened by dense vegetation. On the island of Borneo the white-crowned forktail is sometimes found in drier areas, including along tracks and ridges in the forest, and in heathland.

The white-crowned forktail has a wide geographic distribution across south and south-east Asia, including in parts of India, Bangladesh, China, Myanmar, Bhutan, Thailand, Laos, Vietnam, Malaysia, and Indonesia . The elevational range of the species varies across its geographic distribution. It is common through most of its range but uncommon in the Himalayas. In the Chinese portion of its range, it is reported to be the most common forktail. Though the population of the species is not precisely known, it is thought to be greater than 10,000 individuals, and is estimated to be stable. It is categorized as a species of least concern by the International Union for Conservation of Nature.

Behaviour and ecology
As with other forktails, the white-crowned forktail keeps close to water. It has been observed to frequently wag its tail. It forages along the edges of streams and in the water, primarily for insects, such as black beetles, water crickets, springtails, and caterpillars. Described as a shy bird, it flies close to the ground, usually calling as it does. It is thought to shift its elevational range slightly with the time of year.

The white-crowned forktail breeds between the months of March and September, and possibly till October. The breeding period varies slightly across its range. Eggs have been recorded as early as March in Borneo, and on one occasion a parent with a fledgling was recorded in February. The nest is constructed of moss, plants, leaves, and wood fibre, and is in the shape of a large cup. It is usually located near or over the water, and occasionally in forest gullies nearby. It is usually placed in a hole in a bank or cliff, or among tree roots, and has been observed to have been constructed behind waterfalls, with the birds flying through the water to reach their nest. The location of the nest is always damp.

The species usually lays between two and five eggs, which are creamy, pinkish, or greyish white, and covered in speckles of red-brown, salmon, and lilac. Birds in southern China have been observed to have two broods in a year, a pattern which may hold true elsewhere. The number of eggs in a brood varies with latitude, with individuals in China regularly being recorded laying four to five eggs. The nests of the species have been observed in Myanmar to be parasitized by the Drongo cuckoo.

References

External links

white-crowned forktail
Birds of China
Birds of Southeast Asia
white-crowned forktail
Taxa named by Louis Jean Pierre Vieillot
Taxonomy articles created by Polbot